The National Liberation Army (Spanish: Ejército de Liberación Nacional, ELN) is a Marxist–Leninist guerrilla group involved in the continuing Colombian conflict, which has existed in Colombia since 1964. The ELN advocate a composite communist ideology of Marxism-Leninism and liberation theology. In 2013, it was estimated that the ELN forces consisted of between 1,380 and 3,000 guerrillas. According to former ELN national directorate member Felipe Torres, one fifth of ELN supporters have taken up arms. The ELN has been classified as a terrorist organization by the governments of Colombia, the United States, Canada, the European Union and Venezuela's National Assembly.

History

Formation
The National Liberation Army of Colombia (Ejército de Liberación Nacional, ELN) was founded in 1964, by Fabio Vásquez Castaño and other Colombian rebels trained in Cuba. Later, the ELN was headed by a series of Roman Catholic priests, exponents of Liberation Theology. Most notable was Camilo Torres Restrepo (1929–66), a well-known university professor (egalitarian and Marxist–Leninist) who was openly critical of the what he considered grossly unequal income among the social classes of Colombia. His attraction to the radical ideas of Liberation Theology led him to join the ELN, a guerrilla army intent upon effecting the revolutionary praxis of liberation theology among the poor people of Colombia. Father Camilo was killed in his first combat as an ELN guerrilla, and so became the exemplar ELN soldier, to be emulated by ELN guerrillas and other liberation-theology priests from the lower ranks of the Roman Catholic priesthood.

In the years following its foundation, it brought together more students and young activists from cities than peasants, a social composition that distinguishes it from the FARC guerrillas, who are essentially peasants.

In the 1970s, after suffering military defeat and internal crises, the ELN was commanded by the Spanish priest Father Manuel Pérez Martínez (1943–98), alias El Cura Pérez, who shared leadership with Nicolás Rodríguez Bautista, alias "Gabino". El Cura Pérez presided over the National Liberation Army as one of its most recognized figures until he died of hepatitis B in 1998. He was instrumental in establishing the ideology of the ELN, a composite of Cuban revolutionary theory and liberation theology that proposes the establishment in Colombia of a Christian and communist regime to resolve the socioeconomic problems of chronic political corruption, poverty, and the exclusion of most Colombians from their country's government.

The ELN guerrillas survived the heavy fighting in the Colombian Army's Operation Anorí (1973–74), and then reconstituted their forces, with partial assistance from the Colombian Government of President Alfonso López Michelsen (1974–78), who allowed the ELN to break from and escape encirclement by the Colombian National Army. President López Michelsen helped the ELN in the hope of initiating peace negotiations with them in order to end the civil war. After this, the National Liberation Army of Colombia resumed financing its military operations by means of kidnap for ransom and the extortion of money from Colombian and foreign petroleum companies and by taxation of the private Illegal drug trade of Colombia.

The ELN did not participate in the peace negotiations conducted between the Colombian government of President Andrés Pastrana Arango (1998–2002) and the FARC, yet did participate in an exploratory conference about possibly participating in peace negotiations. A Colombian government initiative towards granting the ELN a demilitarized zone in the southern region of the Bolívar Department was thwarted by right-wing political pressure from the United Self-Defense Forces of Colombia (AUC) whose paramilitary mercenaries conduct anti-guerrilla operations in that part of the Bolívar Department.

First peace discussions: 2002–2017

Early contacts
Previous contacts continued during the early days of the Álvaro Uribe Vélez government but eventually were severed, neither party being fully trusting of the other. Only in mid-2004 the ELN and the government began to make a series of moves that, with the announced mediation of the Vicente Fox government of Mexico, lead to another round of exploratory talks.

On July 24, 2004 the ELN apparently abducted Misael Vacca Ramírez, the Roman Catholic Bishop of Yopal, though their reasons were not clarified. The kidnappers said that Ramírez would be released with a message, but "Francisco Galán", a senior jailed ELN commander who has often acted as an intermediary between the government and the ELN's high command, said he did not know whether the group was responsible. The Bishop was subsequently released by ELN members, in good health, on July 27, after his kidnapping had been condemned by Amnesty International and Pope John Paul II, among others. As far as is publicly known, he did not have any message to announce on behalf of the ELN.

Eventually, the ELN questioned Mexico's participation in the talks, arguing that it did not have confidence in the actions of a government which voted against Fidel Castro's Cuba during a United Nations vote. This led the Mexican government to end its participation.

Exploratory talks in Cuba

In December 2005, the ELN and the Colombian government began a new round of exploratory talks in Havana, Cuba, with the presence of the ELN's military commander "Antonio García", as well as "Francisco Galán" and "Ramiro Vargas". This was considered the direct result of three months of previous consultations with representatives of different sectors of public society through the figure of a "House of Peace" ("Casa de Paz" in Spanish).

Representatives from Norway, Spain and Switzerland joined both parties at the talks as observers.

The talks ended by December 22 and both parties agreed to meet again in January 2006. After a series of preliminary encounters, the next round of talks was later rescheduled for early-mid February.

During the February talks, which moved at a slow pace, the government decided to formally suspend capture orders for "Antonio García" and "Ramiro Vargas", recognizing them as negotiators and, implicitly, as political actors. The move was also joined by the creation of what was termed an alternative and complementary mechanism that could be used to deal with difficult issues and matters that concerned both parties, outside the main negotiating table. A formal negotiation process has yet to begin.

On March 23, the ELN freed a Colombian soldier that it had kidnapped on February 25, delivering him to the International Committee of the Red Cross, saying that it was a unilateral sign of good will.

The ELN's "Antonio García" expected to visit Cuba from April 17 to April 28, participating in different meetings with representatives of several political, economic and social sectors. The third round of the exploratory talks would have originally taken place in La Habana, Cuba from May 2 to May 12.

The third round of talks was later moved to take place from April 25 to April 28.
Both parties reiterated their respect for the content and spirit of all previous agreements, and that they would continue working towards the design of a future peace process. The Colombian government and the ELN intend to study documents previously elaborated during the "House of Peace" stage, as well as documents from other participants and observers. Both parties expected to meet again after Colombia's May 28 presidential elections.

On August 30, 2007 the ELN said that in the statement the dialogues in Havana ended without agreement because of "two different conceptions of peace and methods to get to it".

Restored negotiations

Colombian President Álvaro Uribe invited ELN Spokesman Francisco Galán for new talks about peace on April 3, 2008. The two spoke in the presidential palace. After the meeting Galán says the ELN will return to the negotiation table. The ELN released a press note shortly after that saying the rebel group "does not share the views" of Galán and dismissed him as their spokesman. The Marxist rebels did say they will continue to let Galán negotiate between the Colombian government and the rebels.

On December 7, 2008 18 ELN guerillas surrendered to the Colombian army in the northwestern province of Chocó.

In March 2016 the resumption of peace talks between the parties were announced, but were put on hold until the release of all hostages still kept by the ELN. The last hostages were finally released in February 2017 and the talks commenced in the same month, with Pablo Beltrán and Juan Camilo Restrepo heading the delegations of the ELN and the Colombian government, respectively.

On September 4, 2017, the ELN and President Juan Manuel Santos of Colombia announced a truce to begin on October 1 and to last at least until January 12, 2018.

From May 25 to May 29 the group had a ceasefire in order to allow for "favourable conditions" during the 2018 Colombian Presidential Election. The ELN said it hoped "that this spirit of conciliation of the ELN is answered with a similar behaviour" from the government.

Continued conflict: 2017–2022

2019 Bogotá car bombing 

On 17 January 2019, the ELN performed a car bombing at the General Santander National Police Academy in Bogotá, Colombia. The truck detonated and killed 21 people, including the perpetrator, and injured 68 others. It was the deadliest attack on the Colombian capital since the 2003 El Nogal Club bombing and the first attack on the capital since the 2017 Centro Andino bombing. The ELN accepted responsibility for the attack and justified it as a response to the bombings made by the Colombian government during the unilateral ceasefire.

As a result of the bombing, President Iván Duque Márquez announced on 18 January that peace dialogue between the Government of Colombia and the ELN was officially suspended. Duque also demanded that Cuba extradite the ten ELN leaders that found refuge on the island nation during peace talks and the reactivation of their Interpol Red Notices, and he criticized Venezuela for providing refuge for the ELN on the Colombia-Venezuela border. In response to the request, Cuba's Foreign Minister announced that Cuba would abide by the protocols of ongoing negotiations between both parties.

2019 Venezuelan protests 

The Redes Foundation denounced in the Colombian Public Ministry that armed groups made up of National Liberation Army members and FARC dissidents, supported by the Bolivarian National Police and FAES officials, murdered two Venezuelan protesters, Eduardo José Marrero and Luigi Ángel Guerrero, during a protest in the frontier city of San Cristóbal, on Táchira state. Other protesters were injured during the shooting.

2020 ceasefire over coronavirus 
In March 2020, the National Liberation Army (ELN) declared a unilateral ceasefire during the outbreak of coronavirus pandemic.

General Luis Fernando Navarro asserted on January 5, 2021 that the ELN lost 700 members through targeted attacks in 2020, and that it still had 2,500 armed combatants.

Second peace negotiations: 2022-present

Revival of peace talks

On 21 November 2022, after the election of Gustavo Petro breathed new life into the peace process, delegates of the ELN and the new Colombian government met in Venezuela to resume the peace talks that faltered in January 2019, after the Bogota car bombing. The negotiations continued into the first week of December 2022, with representatives of the ELN and the Colombian government meeting for the continuation of peace talks in the El Ávila National Park in Caracas. On the occasion, ELN chief negotiator Pablo Beltrán stated that Colombians have to work towards reconcilliation and recreate a new nation in peace and equity and in a similar spirit Danilo Rueda, the High Commissioner for Peace in Colombia, stated that peace is not only a question of laying down arms, but a process linked to the need for change. Following the conclusion of the first round of talks, the ELN announced a unilateral holiday truce lasting from 24 December 2022 until 2 January 2023.

After Mexico agreed to be an official guarantor to the peace process, it was chosen as the host country for the second round of talks, expected to begin in January 2023.
With the addition of Mexico, along with Cuba, Chile, Norway and Venezuela, there are now 5 guarantor countries to the peace process.

After misunderstandings arose regarding a bilateral ceasefire between the ELN and the government, an emergency meeting took place on 21 January in Caracas to reassure both sides of their intentions and to set a date for the second round of negotiations, scheduled to commence on 12 February 2023.

Prior to the restart of peace talks, the influential ELN-commander Antonio Garcia criticised the approach of the Colombian government, stating that "the peace process cannot be used as an ‘umbrella’ for other issues”. The former commander of the ELN, Carlos Velandia, dismissed this stance as posturing ahead of the next round of talks, which commenced on time in Mexico City, opining that the ELN wants to negotiate its own accord and not be lumped in with other groups.

Activities 
The U.S. State Department has listed the ELN as a Foreign Terrorist Organization, ostensibly because of its reputation for ransom kidnappings and armed attacks on Colombia's infrastructure. In April 2004, the European Union added the ELN to its list of terrorist organizations for those actions and its breaches of humanitarian law.

The ELN's main source of income are businesses and middle class civilians in its areas of operation. To enforce these "taxes", they frequently take civilians captive to use as leverage. While the ELN uses the terms "war taxes" and "retentions" for these actions, critics insist they constitute "extortion" and "kidnapping".

According to Claudia Calle, spokesperson for País Libre, a Colombian foundation for victims of abductions, the ELN is responsible for the death of 153 hostages between 2000 and 2007. According to País Libre, ELN abducted over 3,000 people between 2000 and 2007 and currently still holds 240 people captive.

Relations

FARC 
The ELN has also occasionally operated with the FARC-EP and like FARC it has targeted civilians, according to a February 2005 report by the United Nations High Commissioner for Human Rights: "During 2004, the FARC-EP and the ELN carried out a series of attacks against the civilian population, including several massacres of civilians and kidnappings by the FARC-EP. There were occasional joint actions by the FARC-EP and the ELN."

In mid-2006, mutual rivalries between local FARC and ELN forces escalated into hostilities in Arauca, along the border with Venezuela. According to the BBC, "the FARC have for some years moved to take over ELN territory near the Venezuelan border, and the smaller rebel army reacted by killing several FARC militants". A statement posted on FARC's homepage accused the ELN of "attacks that we only expected from the enemy".

On 26 May 2008 the ELN wrote a letter to the FARC secretariat, seeking cooperation with Colombia's largest rebel group to overcome "the difficulties we are experiencing in today's Colombian insurgent movement". The letter was published on the ELN website. On 27 June 2017, FARC ceased to be an armed group, disarming itself and handing over its weapons to the United Nations.

FARC dissidents 
According to InSight Crime, the ELN and FARC dissidents allegedly met together in Venezuela to form a potential alliance in October 2018. Sources based in the Arauca department in Colombia provided the information, with reports that the groups would participate in illicit activity together. It was also alleged that former FARC commander Iván Márquez participated in the talks with the ELN.

Venezuela 
Since the 1990s, the ELN began to establish positions in the western border states of Venezuela. The ELN grew close to Venezuelan officials during the tenure of Venezuelan president Hugo Chávez, with Chávez approving relationships with the group.

InSight Crime also states that Venezuelan president Nicolás Maduro was tolerant of the ELN, explaining that "ELN’s expansion in Venezuela has been marked by the Maduro administration’s inaction and even encouragement towards the group"; according to the group, the ELN operates in at least 12 of the 23 states of Venezuela. The Venezuelan NGO Fundación Redes has reported that the Venezuelan military had possibly armed ELN members. In 2019, ELN supported Maduro during the Venezuelan presidential crisis and said they "will fight" US troops if they invade Venezuela.

Tupamaros 
The ELN has received support from the Tupamaro movement in Venezuela, a Venezuelan colectivo and political party. The Tupamaro movement supported the ELN's dialogue with the Colombian government, stating, "The Tupamaro Revolutionary Movement, now more than ever, stands in solidarity with this sister organization in the historic struggle against the neo-Granadian oligarchy and Yankee imperialism. We strongly ratify all of our support for the guerrillas and the ELN High Command, in the process that is developed with the participation of the Colombian people in the resolution of the armed conflict and the construction of peace with social justice".

See also
 Terrorism in Colombia
 Terrorism in Ecuador

References

External links
 
 ELN – Patrialibre.org
 An ELN profile on BBC news
 Rebel Leader's Daring Escape is Blow to Colombia's Government by Jeremy McDermott, October 2009
 UN High Commissioner for Human Rights – Colombia 2005 Report  (Spanish and English)
 Colombia's ELN Rebels Show New Vigour by Jeremy McDermott, BBC News, November 5, 2009
  Who are the victims? – The aftermath of violence in Colombia – (Former combatants in Colombia's internal armed conflict spent two years painting their experiences. They face difficult decisions about what to remember, what to forget and how to forgive)

1964 establishments in Colombia
Colombian guerrilla movements
Communist militant groups
Communist organizations in South America
Far-left politics in Colombia
Organisations designated as terrorist by the European Union
Organizations designated as terrorist by the United States
Organisations designated as terrorist by New Zealand
Organizations based in Latin America designated as terrorist
Organizations based in South America designated as terrorist
Military units and formations established in 1964
Organizations designated as terrorist by Canada
Liberation theology
Christian terrorism in South America
Terrorism in Venezuela
Terrorism in Colombia